Birendranath Sircar (also Sarkar; 5 July 1901 – 28 November 1980) was an Indian film producer and the founder of New Theatres Calcutta. He made Bengali-language films that were noted for introducing many film directors who later became famous. He was awarded the Dada Saheb Phalke Award in 1970 and the third highest civilian award in India, the Padma Bhushan, in 1972.

Early life
B. N. Sircar was born in Bhagalpur to the then Advocate-General of Bengal, Sir N. N. Sircar. After completing his study at Hindu School, Kolkata, he studied Engineering at the University of London and on returning to India he was asked to build a cinema. The project caused him to develop a keen interest in film and he proceeded to build a cinema for the screening of Bengali-language films. Called Chitra, this was opened in Calcutta by Subhas Chandra Bose on 30 December 1930 and was followed by the construction of New Cinema, which showed Hindi films. He then decided to involve himself in making of two silent films.

Career
On 10 February 1931, he founded New Theatres Calcutta. A stickler for quality, Sircar attracted directors such as P.C. Barua, Premankor Atharthi, Debaki Bose, Dhiren Ganguly, Bimal Roy and Phani Majumdar under his wings. Actors such as KL Saigal, Pahadi Sanyal, Amar Mullick, Kanan Devi, Chandrabati Devi, Lila Desai Leela Desai and Prithviraj Kapoor were on his payroll. Technicians like Mukul Bose (Sound Recordist- Director), Yusuf Moolji (Cameraman), Nitin Bose (Cameraman-Director) and Subodh Mitra (Editor) were well aware of the various technical innovations being introduced in Hollywood and Europe and were able to adapt many of these within the limitations of the New Theatres Studio lot. Music composers and singers such as RC Boral, Timir Baran and Pankaj Mullick too were associated with New Theatres productions.
He was the President of the BMPA in the late 1940s

New Theatres

Dena Paona, a Bengali talkie, was released in 1931, directed by Premankur Atarthi and produced by New Theatres. The musician Raichand Boral composed the music for this movie.

In 1935, P.C. Barua directed and acted in Devdas, based on Saratchandra Chatterjee's novel Devdas, and this film became phenomenally successful.

In 1935, playback singing was first used in India in the Bengali film Bhagya Chakra by Nitin Bose. The singers were K C Dey, Parul Ghosh and Suprabha Sarkar. Dhoop Chhaon, Hindi remake of this film, was the first Hindi film to use playback singing.

Kanan Devi was the first popular star actress, who appeared in many films produced by New Theatres. Also there was a group of talented actors with New Theatres like K.L. Saigal, K. C. Dey, Prithviraj Kapoor, Chhabi Biswas, Bikash Roy, Pahari Sanyal, Basanta Choudhury.

Top directors like Premankur Atarthi, P.C. Barua, Debaki Bose and Nitin Bose worked in New Theatres films. The musicians who worked there include R. C. Boral, Pankaj Mullick and Timir Baran.

He received the Dadasaheb Phalke Award, the highest award in Indian cinema give by Government of India in 1970, and in 1972 he was awarded the Padma Bhushan, by Government of India.

Filmography
Sircar's films include:

 Dena Paona (Released 30 December 1931) – Directed by Premankur Atarthi
 Natir Puja (Released 22 March 1932)
 Punarjanma (Released 2 April 1932) – Directed by Premankur Atarthi
 Mohabbat Ke Ansu Urdu, (Released 1932) – Directed by Premankur Atarthi
 Zinda Lash Urdu, (Released 1932) – Directed by Premankur Atarthi
 Chirakumar Sabha (Released 28 May 1932) – Directed by Premankur Atarthi
 Pallisamaj (Released 1 July 1932) – Directed by Sisir Bhaduri
 Chandidas (Released 24 September 1932) – Directed by Debaki Bose
 Kapalkundala (Released 20 May 1933) – Directed by Premankur Atarthi
 Mastuto Bhai (short) (Released 20 May 1933) – Directed by Dhirendranath Gangopadhyay
 Sita (Released 26 October 1933) – Directed by Sisir Bhaduri
 Mirabai (Released 11 November 1933) – Directed by Debaki Bose
 Excuse Me Sir (short) (Released 30 March 1934) – Directed by Dhirendranath Gangopadhyay
 Ruplekha (Released 14 April 1934) – Directed by P.C. Barua
 P.Brothers (Cartoon) (Released 23 June 1934) – Directed by Raichand Boral
 Mahua (Released 31 August 1934) – Directed by Hiren Bose
 Devdas (Released 30 March 1935) – Directed by Nitin Bose
 Abaseshe (short) (Released 24 August 1935) – Directed by Dineshranjan Das
 Bhagyachakra (Released 3 October 1935) – Directed by Nitin Bose
 Grihadaha (Released 10 October 1936) – Directed by P.C. Barua
 Mando Ki (short) (Released 21 October 1936) – Directed by Tulsi Lahiri
 Maya (Released 23 December 1936) – Directed by P.C. Barua
 Didi (Released 3 April 1937) – Directed by Nitin Bose
 Mukti (Released 18 September 1937) – Directed by P.C. Barua
 Arghya (short) (Released 25 September 1937)
 Bidyapati (Released 2 April 1938) – Directed by Debaki Bose
 Abhignan (Released 11 June 1938) – Directed by Prafulla Ray
 Desher mati (Released 17 August 1938) – Directed by Nitin Bose
 Achinpriya (Released 29 October 1938) – Directed by Dhirendranath Gangopadhyay
 Sathi (Released 3 December 1938) – Directed by Phani Majumdar
 Adhikar (Released 12 January 1939) – Directed by P.C. Barua
 Baradidi (Released 7 April 1939) – Directed by Amar Mullik
 Sapure (Released 27 May 1939) – Directed by Debaki Bose
 Rajat Jayanti (Released 12 August 1939) – Directed by P.C. Barua
 Jiban Maran (Released 14 October 1939) – Directed by Nitin Bose
 Parajoy (Released 22 March 1940) – Directed by Hemchandra Chandra
 Daktar (Released 31 August 1940) – Directed by Phani Majumdar
 Abhinetri (Released 30 November 1940) – Directed by Amar Mullik
 Nartaki (Released 18 January 1941) – Directed by Debaki Bose
 Parichoy (Released 25 April 1941) – Directed by Nitin Bose
 Pratishruti (Released 14 August 1941) – Directed by Hemchandra Chandra
 Shodhbodh (Released 28 March 1942) – Directed by Soumen Mukhopadhyay
 Minakshi (Released 12 June 1942) – Directed by Madhu Bose
 Priyo Bandhabi (Released 23 January 1943) – Directed by Soumen Mukhopadhyay
 Kashinath (Released 2 April 1943) – Directed by Nitin Bose
 Dikshul (Released 12 June 1943) – Directed by Premankur Atarthi
 Udayer Pathey (Released 1 September 1944) – Directed by Bimal Roy
 Dui Purush (Released 30 August 1945) – Directed by Subodh Mitra
 Biraj Bou (Released 5 July 1946) – Directed by Amar Mullik
 Nurse Sisi (Released 27 April 1947) – Directed by Subodh Mitra
 Ramer Sumati (Released 24 December 1947) – Directed by Kartik Chattopadhyay
 Pratibad (Released 19 June 1948) – Directed by Hemchandra Chandra
 Anjangarh (Released 24 September 1948) – Directed by Bimal Roy
 Mantramugdha (Released 14 January 1949) – Directed by Bimal Roy
 Bishnupriya (Released 7 October 1949) – Directed by Hemchandra Chandra
 Rupkatha (Released 13 October 1950) – Directed by Soren Sen
 Aadur Prem, 2011 – Directed by Somnath Gupta

See also
 Cinema of India

B.N. Sircar : भारतीय सिनेमा के विकास की बुनियाद के एक सर्जक https://cinemanthan.com/2013/10/04/bnsircar/ ==References==

External links
www.kundanlalsaigal.com – Comprehensive Resource Website, offering preview of all his songs.
www.pankajmullick.com – Comprehensive Resource Website, offering preview of his songs.
www.krishnachandradey.com – Comprehensive Resource Website, offering preview of his songs.
www.kanandevi.com
 
 Musicians
 A short history of Bengali cinema
 A Biography of B N Sircar
 An article on New Theatres by Sharmistha Gooptu

1901 births
1980 deaths
Bengali Hindus
Bengali film producers
Film producers from Kolkata
Recipients of the Padma Bhushan in arts
Dadasaheb Phalke Award recipients
20th-century Indian businesspeople